Curran is an Irish surname.

Background

The surname Curran derives from a number of unrelated Irish families:

 Ó Corráin –  at least three distinct families of the name located in what are now counties Tipperary and Waterford; County Galway; County Leitrim; County Kerry and County Fermanagh. The Currans of Kerry are said to have originated with the Ui Charrain, of the Uí Meic Caille sept of the Uí Liatháin kings of Munster. The Uí Liatháin descended from Eochu Liathán ("Eochu the Grey"), son of Dáire Cerbba, who was, according to the Munster epic Forbhais Droma Dámhgháire, king of Medón Mairtine. According to the Annals of Inisfallen, the modern-day presence of the Curran family in County Kerry is the result of the war in 1177 between Domnall Mór Ua Briain, King of Thomond, and Diarmait Mor Mac Carthaigh, during which the Uí Meic Caille fled across the Lee; for some this departure was permanent, with many Currans becoming Kerry gentry. Descendants Thomas and Dowenald O Corran were amongst those summoned to serve in arms against the Earl of Desmond in 1345.
 Ó Cuirín – County Donegal
 Mac Corraidhín – apparently now rendered as Crean in County Kerry

The surname Curran is common in all four provinces in Ireland, but especially in County Donegal and throughout Ulster. The name is also prevalent in the south of Ireland, appearing many times in the County Tipperary Hearth Money Rolls of 1665–67. Currans showed up frequently as Waterford residents in the census of 1659.

People
 Alex Curran (born 1982), British fashion model and columnist, wife of footballer Steven Gerrard
 Alvin Curran (born 1938), American composer
 Barbara A. Curran (1940-2022), American politician, judge, and lawyer
 Ben Curran (born 1996), English cricketer, brother of Sam and Tom
 Brian Curran (born 1963), Canadian ice hockey player
 Brittany Curran (born 1990), American actress
 Charles Curran (disambiguation), several people
 Chuck Curran (born 1939), American politician
 Clare Curran (born 1960), New Zealand politician
 Dennis Patrick Curran (born 1953), American chemist
 Denny Curran (1875–1968), Irish sportsman and politician
 Donnchadh Ó Corráin, Irish historian
 Frances Curran (born 1961), Scottish politician
 Frank Curran (disambiguation), several people
 Gerald Curran (1939–2013), American politician
 Harry Curran (born 1966), Scottish footballer
 Henry 'Babe' Curran (1896–1964), Australian wool-grower
 Henry M. Curran (1918–1993), New York politician
 Homer Curran (1885–1952), American theatrical producer
 Hugh McCollum Curran (1875–1960), American forester
 J. Joseph Curran Jr. (born 1931), American politician from Maryland
 Jack Curran (1930–2013), American High School athletics coach
 Jesse Curran (born 1996), Australian soccer player
 Jimmy Curran (1880–1963), Scots/American athlete and athletics coach
 Joan Curran (1916–1999), Welsh physicist, inventor of "chaff" radar countermeasures
 John Curran (disambiguation), several people
 John (Jack) Bernard Curran (1932–2003), Canadian broadcaster
 John Joseph Curran (1859–1936), Canadian politician and lawyer
 John Philpot Curran (1750–1817), Irish orator, politician, wit, lawyer and judge, Master of the Rolls
 Johnny Curran (1924–1985), Scottish footballer
 Joseph Curran (disambiguation) several people
 Kevin Curran (disambiguation), several people
 Mairead Curran (born 1968), Australian voiceover artist
 Margaret Curran (disambiguation), several people
 Mary Katharine Curran (1844–1920), American botanist
 Matthew Curran (1882–1938), Irish boxer of the 1900s–1920s
 Mike Curran (born 1944), American ice-hockey player
 Nick Curran (born 1977), American rock/blues musician 
 Paul Curran (disambiguation), several people
 Pearl Lenore Curran (1883–1937), American author who wrote as Patience Worth
 Pete Curran (1860–1910), British trade unionist and politician, Member of Parliament for Jarrow
 Robert Curran (disambiguation), several people
 Robert Curran, Sr. (born c. 1804-26 Dec 1871), Irish Blacksmith in Eastern County Down; Husband of Catherine (born c. 1799-3 Jan 1879)
 Robert Curran, Jr. (born c. 16 Mar 1836-8 Jun 1890), Irish Sea Captain and Master Mariner of Merchant Ship SS Leona, Ship Registration No. 57,467, Registered Port: Belfast; born at Portaferry, County Down; Husband of Mary McSherry (circa 1838-30 Aug 1894); In July 1857 he and brothers Thomas, John and Patrick Curran, all of Portaferry, County Down, were convicted of Assault and Served Sentence at Belfast's Crumlin Road Gaol and Downpatrick County Gaol; died of what is now known as Secondary Drowning on board his sailing vessel, the Leona of Belfast, the morning after falling into 8 feet of water in Sligo Quay (drunk trying to get back on board his boat)
 Robert Patrick Curran, Sr. (2 Nov 1879-5 Mar 1933), Irish Ship Steward for White Star Line’s RMS Olympic, M.V. Georgic and SS Laurentic; Died from Severe 1st Degree Burns To Body (After falling asleep while smoking cigarette in bed, his clothes caught fire); son of Captain Robert Curran, Jr. of Portaferry, Co. Down
 Sam Curran (born 1998), English cricketer; brother of Tom Curran
 Sir Samuel Curran (1912–1998), British physicist and founder of the University of Strathclyde
 Sarah Curran (1782–1808), daughter of John Philpot Curran and wife of Robert Emmet
 Séamus Ó Cuirrín, Bishop of Killaloe 1526–42
 Sean Curran (disambiguation), several people
 Shane Curran (disambiguation), several people
 Simon Ó Cuirrin, Bishop of Kilfenora 1300–1302
 Terry Curran (born 1955), English footballer
 Tom Curran (disambiguation), several people
 Tony Curran, Scottish actor
 William Curran (disambiguation), several people
 
In fiction:
 Curran (Eyes of the Dragon), a character in Stephen King's The Eyes of the Dragon
 Jenny Curran, a character from Forrest Gump played by Robin Wright Penn
 Detective Nick Curran, a character in the movie Basic Instinct played by Michael Douglas
 Amanda (Mandy) Curran, a character in Stanley Kubrick's Eyes Wide Shut played by Julienne Davis
 Curran Lennart, a character from Ilona Andrews’s Kate Daniels series

References

English-language surnames
Anglicised Irish-language surnames